Narie Hem, also known as Nary Hem (born February 1937), is a Cambodian actress known for her portrayal of Dara in the French film Bird of Paradise (l'Oiseau de Paradis) by Marcel Camus.

Early life 
Hem (née Hem-Reun) was born in Cambodia to Hem Chiam Reun, a chief commissioner, and Hem Dak Peay. She is the second oldest of eleven children. Her brother Yvon Hem was a well-known Cambodian film director who died in August 2012.

She studied piano earning her place at the French Conservatory of Music. She was sent to Paris where she attended a boarding school.

She returned to Phnom Penh, Cambodia where she became more involved in acting. She was cast by Marcel Camus to portray the role of Dara, a beautiful Khmer dancer, alongside Nop Nem and the princess Bopha Dévi in his film Bird of Paradise (l'Oiseau de Paradis) in 1962. Her brother, Yvon Hem, also worked on the film as a production assistant.

With the help of their father, Narie and Yvon created their own production company, Baksey Thaansuo (khmer for "bird of paradise").

Personal life 
Hem moved to Thonon-les-Bains, France after the death of her first husband Armand Gaston Gerbié with whom she had two children. Her son Armand was born in 1960 and her daughter Soriya was born in 1961. After the death of her husband, she remarried, changing her name to Narie Duteil.

Hem has 3 grandchildren: 2 granddaughters, Valentine (born 1998) and Alexanne (born 2001) by her daughter Soriya and one grandson, James (born 2008) by her son Armand. She currently lives in France where she is retired.

Filmography

References 

Cambodian film actresses
1937 births
Living people